N II U is the only studio album by American R&B group N II U, released July 19, 1994 via Arista Records. The album did not chart on the Billboard 200; however, it peaked at #90 on the Billboard R&B Albums chart and #39 on the Billboard Heatseekers chart. The album's second single, "I Miss You", was the only song from the album to chart on the Billboard Hot 100, peaking at #22.

Track listing

Chart positions

References

External links
 

1994 debut albums
Albums produced by Clive Davis
Arista Records albums
Contemporary R&B albums by American artists